Beth L. Long (born April 7, 1948) is a former American Republican politician who served in the Missouri House of Representatives.

Born in Lebanon, Missouri, she attended Drury College.  She was the first woman elected to county office in Laclede County, Missouri.

References

1948 births
Living people
20th-century American politicians
21st-century American politicians
20th-century American women politicians
21st-century American women politicians
Republican Party members of the Missouri House of Representatives
Women state legislators in Missouri